Kadell is a given name. Notable people with the name include:

 Kadell Daniel (born 1994), English-Guyanese footballer
 Kadell Thomas (born 1996), Canadian soccer player

See also
 Kadwell

Masculine given names